Betty White's Off Their Rockers is an American comedy television series launched in 2012, that broadcast on NBC for its first two seasons and Lifetime for its third. The series is hosted by Betty White, and is based on the Belgian television format Benidorm Bastards.

Production
A sneak preview was released on January 16, 2012, in tribute to Betty White's 90th birthday. The show officially premiered April 4, 2012. White hosts the series, and also serves as an executive producer for the show.

On May 13, 2012, NBC renewed the series for a second season in the mid-season schedule. On July 11, 2013, The Hollywood Reporter reported that NBC had canceled the series, citing a drop-off in ratings and low DVR viewership.

It was announced on October 18, 2013, that Lifetime has revived the series for a twenty episode third season. Season 3 premiered on February 28, 2014 and was confirmed for 20 episodes, but, in mid-season, the series took a three-year hiatus and resumed broadcast in September 2017.

Premise
The elderly play pranks on members of the younger generation, in the manner of Candid Camera, Trigger Happy TV, or Punk'd. It is based on the Belgian television format Benidorm Bastards.

Episodes

International broadcasts
In Canada, the series began broadcasting on CTV on January 16, 2012, in the Monday 8:00 p.m. timeslot, as a special preview, but moved to Wednesday at 8:00 p.m. on the CTV Two television system on April 4, 2012, after airing the first special preview episode. Since 2017, the series has run on CHCH.

In Norway, it started running on TVNorge on July 4, 2012.

In Germany, it started running on Prosieben.

In Australia, the program airs on the Comedy Channel, with a local version that premiered in 2012.

In New Zealand, the program aired on TVNZ 2 Sundays at 7.30pm, later shifted to Saturdays at 6pm.

In Finland, the program airs on TV5.

In the United Kingdom, ITV announced its own adaptation of the show. Following the American adaptation, it was also entitled Off Their Rockers but with different characters. The first episode aired April 7, 2013. The UKTV channel Watch began airing the US version on 13 August 2014.

In Serbia, the program airs on Prva Plus.

In the Netherlands, the program airs on RTL4 but is renamed Benidorm Bastards USA.

In Ireland, the program airs on TV3.

In Brazil, the original show airs on paid channel Multishow from Mondays to Fridays, and the local version airs on Sundays by SBT.

In India, the original show was aired on 10 September 2015 on Comedy Central India on Monday to Friday at 10:00 p.m.

Online media
In the United States, users could watch full episodes of the NBC season on the network's official website. In Canada, people could watch full episodes on the CTV official website.

Awards and nominations

References

External links
 
 

2010s American comedy television series
2012 American television series debuts
2017 American television series endings
English-language television shows
American television series revived after cancellation
American hidden camera television series
Lifetime (TV network) original programming
NBC original programming
American television series based on Belgian television series
Betty White